Ayothiapattinam is a panchayat town in Salem district  in the state of Tamil Nadu, India.

Geography

Location
Ayothiapattinam is located 7 km east of Salem city. It acts as a gateway to Salem City for the people coming from east and northeast districts of Tamil Nadu. It is located 35 km from Yercaud, 168 km from Coimbatore, 195 km from Bengaluru and 330 km from Chennai.

Demographics
At the 2001 India census, Ayothiapattinam had a population of 9,956. Males constituted 50% of the population and females 50%. Ayothiapattinam had an average literacy rate of 67%, higher than the national average of 59.5%; with 56% of the males and 44% of females literate. 11% of the population was under 6 years of age.

References

Cities and towns in Salem district
Purana temples of Vishnu